The National Basketball League Assist Champion is an annual National Basketball League (NBL) award given since the 1984 New Zealand NBL season to the player with the highest assists per game average of the regular season. The winner receives the Dave Taylor Trophy.

Winners 

|}

See also
 List of National Basketball League (New Zealand) awards

References

Awards established in 1984
ass
A